The Apostolic Vicariate of Aysén is a Latin Church missionary ecclesiastical territory or apostolic vicariate of the Catholic Church in Chile. Originally, it was established as an apostolic prefecture on 17 February 1940  by Pope Pius XII and was subsequently elevated to apostolic vicariate on 8 May 1955. Its current bishop (Vicar Apostolic) is Mgr. Luigi Infanti della Mora, O.S.M.

Diocesan statistics
The vicariate, which comprises the entire Region of Aisén (Aisén) in southern Chile, covers a territory of 109,865 km² and has 6 parishes. It is estimated than  79%  of the  inhabitants of the vicariate are Catholic. This figure represents about 72,000 Catholics out of a total population of 90,000. The vicariate is entrusted to the priests of the  Lombardo-Veneto province (Italy) of the Servite Order.
The mother church of the diocese is the Cathedral of Santa Teresita in the city of Puerto Aisén.

Bishops of the vicariate
 Antonio María Michelato Danese † (5 April 1940 – September 1958 resigned)
 Cesar Gerardo Vielmo Guerra † (19 December 1959 – 16 June 1963, died)
 Savino Bernardo Maria Cazzaro Bertollo (10 December 1963 – 8 February 1988 appointed archbishop of Puerto Montt)
 Aldo Maria Lazzarín Stella † (15 May 1989 – 19 January 1998 resigned)
 Luigi Infanti della Mora (30 August 1999 – )

Parishes

 Santa Teresita, Cathedral - Puerto Aysén

Communities comprised in the parish: Sagrado Corazón, El Buen Pastor, El Carmen, Nuestra Señora de Guadalupe, Catedral, Jesús Nazareno, Puerto Chacabuco. Comunidades Rurales: El Salto, Los Torreones, El Balseo, Villa Mañihuales, Alto Mañihuales

 Nuestra Señora de los Dolores, Co-cathedral - Coyhaique

Communities comprised in the parish:

Urban: Co-catedral, Maria Inmaculada, Santuario Del Carmen, Sagrada Familia, San José, Cristo Obrero, Siete Santos Fundadores, Santos Juan Y Pablo, Santuario Jesús Nazareno, Santa Teresita de los Andes.

Rural: Balmaceda, El Blanco, Puerto Ibáñez, Levican, Cerro Castillo, Lago Pollux, Valle Simpson, Villa Frei, Seis Lagunas, Lago Atravesado, Alto Baguales, Villa Ortega, El Gato, Ñirehuao

 Nuestra Señora del Carmen - Chile Chico

Communities comprised in the parish: Chile Chico, Fachinal, Mallin Grande, Puerto Guadal, Puerto Bertrand, Río Tranquilo, Bahía Murta, Puerto Sánchez.

 Estrella del Mar - Puerto Aguirre

Communities comprised in the parish: Puerto Aguirre, Caleta Andrade, Estero Copa

 San José Obrero - Cochrane

Communities comprised in the parish: Cochrane, Caleta Tortel, Villa O'Higgins

 Nuestra Señora del Trabajo - Puerto Cisnes

Communities comprised in the parish: Puerto Cisnes, Villa Amengual, La Tapera, Lago Verde, La Junta, Puyuhuapi, Puerto Raúl Marín Balmaceda, Puerto Gala, Puerto Gaviota.

References

External links
Website of the diocese (in Spanish)
Apostolic Vicariate of Aisén at the www.catholic-hierarchy.org website

Aysen
Aysen
Aysen, Apostolic Vicariate
Aysen